Eric Kwok Wai-leung (born 3 February 1974) is a Hong Kong Cantopop music producer, composer, singer, and actor.

Life and career

Eric Kwok was born on 3 February 1974, in British Hong Kong. He moved to the United States at the age of 13 and later graduated from the University of California, Los Angeles majoring in communication. His passion for music started when he received a piano keyboard as a gift from his mother and would spend ten hours a day playing with it. His father is a former lawyer. Although initially not supportive of Kwok's music career, he eventually cried after listening to his first solo album Eric Kwok Collection, released in 2004. Kwok returned to Hong Kong and launched his first songwriting credit in 1997 with Leon Lai's "If You Are at My Home Tonight", under the pen name Moz. He is a former member of the music duo Swing from 1999 to 2002. Over the years, he has written and produced hits for various artistes, including Leon Lai, Eason Chan, Cass Phang, and Kay Tse, to name a few. In 2022, Kwok took on the role of coaching director in the TVB's singing competition show Stars Academy 2.

Discography

Eric Kwok Collection (2004)
Eric Kwok Cantonese Album (Eric Kwok 廣東大碟) (2007)
Eric Kwok's Leet Collection (2009)
Eric Kwok Best Selections (我最喜愛的Eric Kwok作品展) (2014)

Representative works

Leon Lai – "If You Are at My Home Tonight" – 1997
Jacky Cheung – "A Person Behind You" – 1999
Sally Yeh – "Mourning" – 2002
Miriam Yeung – "Miriam Yeung" – 2002
Edison Chen – "Number Nine" – 2003
Eason Chan – "Ambush From All Sides" – 2003
Eason Chan – "Sunsets" – 2005
Eason Chan – "My Best But Injurious Friend" – 2006
Hacken Lee – "Which House Will the Flower Land" – 2007
Eason Chan – "The Great Wheel of Times" – 2007
Kay Tse – "Wedding Invitation Street" – 2008
Eason Chan – "Unhindered – 2009
Joey Yung – "Not Yet Lovers" – 2011
Eason Chan – "Heavy Taste" – 2012
Eason Chan – "End" – 2012
Hacken Lee – "House of Cards" – 2013
Eason Chan – "Faraway" – 2013
Eric Kwok – "Iron Man" – 2014
Eason Chan – "Unconditional – 2015
Eason Chan – "To Like Someone" – 2015
Gin Lee – "In Pairs" – 2016
Gin Lee – "Flight Attendant" – 2017
Gin Lee – "Very Strong" – 2018
Angela Hui – "Don't Be Good to Me" – 2020
Mike Tsang – "I'm Not As Good" – 2021
Mike Tsang feat. JC – "I'm Not a Cupid" – 2021
Gin Lee feat. Jacky Cheung – "When the Sun Rises" – 2021

Filmography

Television series

Film

Concerts
My Favorite Eric Kwok Concert (2014)

References

Footnotes

External links

1974 births
Living people
21st-century Hong Kong male singers
Hong Kong film actors
Cantopop singers
Hong Kong television actors